Lê Thế Cường (born 14 December 1990) is a Vietnamese footballer who plays as a midfielder for V.League 1 club Hải Phòng.

In October 2016 Thế Cường joined Cần Thơ in a two-year deal worth more than 1 đồng. Thế Cường stated that his reason for leaving SLNA was because he wished to have more playing time.

However in December 2016 after a season of playing for Cần Thơ, Thế Cường signed a new three year contract with his former club SNLA agreeing to rejoin them in the 2017 season.

References

1990 births
Living people
Vietnamese footballers
V.League 1 players
Song Lam Nghe An FC players
Can Tho FC players
Association football midfielders